Bishops' College, Cheshunt was an Anglican theological College set up to train clergy to serve in the Church of England. It was housed in buildings formerly used by a non-conformist college that moved to Cambridge in 1905. It operated from 1909 until 1968. Since then they have been used as local government buildings.

Notes

Former theological colleges in England
 01
Anglican seminaries and theological colleges
Education in Hertfordshire
Educational institutions established in 1909
Educational institutions disestablished in 1968
1909 establishments in England
1969 disestablishments in England
Cheshunt